Virtual Realities 2.0 is a supplement published by FASA in 1995 for the dystopian cyberpunk role-playing game Shadowrun.

Contents
Virtual Realities 2.0, by Paul Hume with Carl Sargent, and Michael Mulvihill, offers a completely new system for dealing with deckers and the Matrix, designed to simplify and streamline the process of hacking.

Reception
In the February 1996 edition of Arcane (Issue 3), Andy Butcher gave it an above-average rating of 8 out of 10, saying, "Virtual Realities 2.0 is one of the most impressive Shadowrun rules supplements ever, and any referee who has even the slightest interest in player-character deckers will find it indispensable. It doesn't solve all the problems, but it makes things a lot easier." 

In the March 1996 edition of Dragon (Issue 227), Rick Swan called this book "essential", saying, "As veteran netrunners will confirm, the cumbersome Matrix system has always been the weakest element of the Shadowrun game. FASA comes to the rescue with this overdue revision, which trims the fat from the original, upgrades the rules for Matrix mapping, and, in general, makes cyberspace a more enjoyable place to play."

References

Role-playing game supplements introduced in 1995
Shadowrun supplements